James Robert Hindman (February 4, 1839 – October 12, 1912) was the 23rd Lieutenant Governor of Kentucky.

He was born in Bourbon County, Kentucky in 1839. In 1883, he ran for and was elected Lieutenant Governor of Kentucky, serving a full four-year term under Governor J. Proctor Knott, a Democrat.

The city of Hindman in Knott County, Kentucky is named after him.

Sources
James Robert Hindman entry at The Political Graveyard

References

External links

1839 births
1912 deaths
Kentucky Democrats
Lieutenant Governors of Kentucky
People from Bourbon County, Kentucky
19th-century American politicians